Dissent from the Living Room is an album released independently by Matthew Ryan in 2002.

Track listing
All words and music by Matthew Ryan, except where noted.

 "The Little Things" – 2:26
 "Such a Sad Satellite" – 4:34
 "Fd29yrblues" – 2:32
 "After the Last Day of a Heat Wave" (Matthew Ryan, David Ricketts) – 3:23
 "Demoland Part 1" – 4:49
 "Emergency Room Machines Say Breathe" – 7:23
 "No Going Back" – 5:29
 "The Ballad of So and So" – 4:07
 "Anymore" – 3:41
 "Happy for You" – 4:32
 "Into the Sourdays" – 3:15
 "Demoland Part 2" – 3:47
 "Elise Is the 13th Disciple?" – 2:48

2002 albums
Matthew Ryan (musician) albums